Solsidan is a locality in Ekerö Municipality, Stockholm County, Sweden. It had 349 inhabitants in 2010.

References 

Populated places in Ekerö Municipality
Uppland